The following article presents a summary of the 1992–93 football season in the Republic of Macedonia, which is the first season of competitive football in the country after a country's declaration of independence from Yugoslavia.

Summary

League Competitions

First League

Second League

Macedonian Cup

Final

See also
1992–93 FK Vardar season

External links
Football Federation of Macedonia 
MacedonianFootball.com 

 
Seasons in North Macedonia football